Jan Kalabiška (born 22 December 1986) is a Czech footballer who currently plays for 1. FC Slovácko as a winger.

References
 
 
 Guardian Football

1984 births
Living people
Czech footballers
Association football forwards
Czech First League players
1. FK Příbram players
FC Sellier & Bellot Vlašim players
FC Zbrojovka Brno players
FK Senica players
FK Mladá Boleslav players
Slovak Super Liga players
Expatriate footballers in Slovakia
Czech expatriate sportspeople in Slovakia
People from Mělník
MFK Karviná players
1. FC Slovácko players
Sportspeople from the Central Bohemian Region